Vitaliy Bohdanov (born February 22, 1990) is a Ukrainian footballer.

Playing career 
Bohdanov began his career with FC Ternopil in 2012 in the Ukrainian Second League. The following season he assisted in securing promotion to the Ukrainian First League. After the club's relegation in 2017 he played with FC ODEK Orzhiv in the Ukrainian Football Amateur League. In 2018, he played abroad in the Canadian Soccer League with FC Ukraine United. In his debut season in Toronto he assisted in securing the First Division title.

External links

References 

1990 births
Living people
Ukrainian footballers
FC Ternopil players
FC ODEK Orzhiv players
FC Ukraine United players
Ukrainian First League players
Canadian Soccer League (1998–present) players
Association football midfielders
Ukrainian Second League players
Sportspeople from Rivne Oblast